The Joint Tactical Ground Station (JTAGS) is the United States Army's element to United States Strategic Command's Theater Event System (TES). TES provides an integrated, in-theater, 24-hour overhead non-imaging infrared detection capability for processing and disseminating missile early warning, alerting, and cueing information data to combatant commanders and missile defense assets through the use of stereo processing of the Defense Support Program (DSP) satellite data.

The Joint Tactical Ground Station (JTAGS) is the Army's primary system that provides space based integrated, in-theater missile warning. It provides continuous
processing of overhead non-imaging infrared (ONIR) data that is directly down linked from the Defense Support Program (DSP) satellite constellation. This data is
used to provide near real-time dissemination of warning, alerting and cueing information, to combatant commanders (CCDRs) and ballistic missile defense
systems (BMDS), on ballistic missile threats for the protection of military assets, civilian populations, and geopolitical centers. This dissemination is accomplished by
using existing communication networks such as the Integrated Broadcast Service (IBS) and Link 16.

JTAGS Mission 

"(U) Receive and process in-theater, direct down-linked data from OPIR (Overhead Persistent Infrared) Sensors in order to disseminate warning, alerting and cueing information on tactical ballistic missiles and other events of interest throughout the theater using existing communication networks."

JTAGS Organization 
The Joint Tactical Ground Station Theater Missile Warning system is organized under the 1st Space Company (JTAGS), with 4 forward-stationed Detachments in Europe, CENTCOM, Korea, and Japan.  The 1st Space Company falls under the 1st Space Battalion, under the 1st Space Brigade, part of the US Army Space and Missile Defense Command

See also 
Theater Event System
Defense Support Program
Space Based Infrared System

References

External links 
 
 Space Based InfraRed System (SBIRS)

Military equipment
Missile defense
United States Army Service Component Commands
Organizations based in Colorado Springs, Colorado